MP 30 or MP30 may refer to:

MP30, a submachine gun
Chattian, MP 30, a zone during the Oligocene